Established in 2009, the Faculty of Communication, Art and Technology (FCAT) at Simon Fraser University in British Columbia, Canada encompasses 5 Schools and Programs.

The Office of the Dean is located in the Burnaby Campus. Schools and Programs in the Faculty are taught on all three SFU campuses, including Burnaby, Vancouver, and Surrey. The current Dean of FCAT is Dr. Carman Neustaedter.

Schools/Programs

School of Communication (CMNS)
Undergraduate concentrations:
 Media and Culture
 Technology and Society
 Political Economy and Policy

School for the Contemporary Arts (SCA)
Housed in the Woodward's Building.

Undergraduate concentration
 Dance
 Film
 Music Composition (Acoustic & Electroacoustic) 
 Theatre (Performance & Production and Design) 
 Visual Art
 Visual Cultural & Performance Studies

Publishing Programs (PUB)
The Minor in Print and Digital Publishing provides the foundation for students to pursue advanced professional education, or to take jobs in publishing or allied cultural industries.

School of Interactive Arts and Technology (SIAT)
Undergraduate concentration
 Interactive Systems
 Web Applications
 Media Arts
 Design

Master of Digital Media Program (MDM)

Undergraduate programs
Bachelor of Arts Degrees in:
 Communication
 Contemporary Arts
 Interactive Arts and Technology
 Publishing

Bachelor of Science Degrees in:
 Interactive Arts and Technology

Graduate programs
M.A. and PhD Graduate Degrees in:
Communication
Contemporary Arts
Interactive Arts and Technology
Publishing

Master of Science and Ph.D. Degrees in:
 Interactive Arts and Technology

See also
Education in Canada
Simon Fraser University
Higher Education in British Columbia
Woodward's building

References

Simon Fraser University
Educational institutions established in 2009
2009 establishments in British Columbia